John Silas Lundy (July 6, 1894 – April 26, 1973) was an American physician and anesthesiologist who established the first post-anesthesia recovery room and the first blood bank in the United States.

References

1894 births
1973 deaths
American anesthesiologists
People from Grand Forks County, North Dakota
Mayo Clinic people